Buclovany is a village and municipality in Bardejov District in the Prešov Region of north-east Slovakia.

History
In historical records the village was first mentioned in 1345.

Geography
The municipality lies at an altitude of 245 metres and covers an area of 4.095 km².
It has a population of about 230 people.

Genealogical resources

The records for genealogical research are available at the state archive "Statny Archiv in Presov, Slovakia"

 Roman Catholic church records (births/marriages/deaths): 1848-1908 (parish B)
 Greek Catholic church records (births/marriages/deaths): 1800-1895 (parish B)
 Lutheran church records (births/marriages/deaths): 1747-1895 (parish B)

See also
 List of municipalities and towns in Slovakia

External links
 
https://web.archive.org/web/20071217080336/http://www.statistics.sk/mosmis/eng/run.html
Surnames of living people in Buclovany

Villages and municipalities in Bardejov District
Šariš